The olive-chested flycatcher (Myiophobus cryptoxanthus) is a species of bird in the family Tyrannidae. It is found in Ecuador and Peru. Its natural habitat is subtropical or tropical moist montane forests.

References

olive-chested flycatcher
Birds of the Ecuadorian Andes
Birds of the Peruvian Andes
olive-chested flycatcher
olive-chested flycatcher
Taxonomy articles created by Polbot